The Belarus national football team represents Belarus in international football and is controlled by the Football Federation of Belarus, the governing body for football in Belarus. Belarus' home ground is Dinamo Stadium in Minsk. Since independence in 1991, Belarus has not yet qualified for a FIFA World Cup or UEFA European Championship.

History
After the split of the Soviet Union, Belarus played their first match against Lithuania on 20 July 1992. Before that, a number of Belarusian players played for the Soviet Union national team. The first FIFA-recognized international was a friendly against Ukraine on 28 October 1992, and their first win came in a match against Luxembourg on 12 October 1994.

Belarus have never qualified for either the FIFA World Cup, or the UEFA European Championship. The team were defeated by Wales in the last 2002 group stage match, missing the chance to overtake Ukraine, who drew their last game, finishing the group second.

Their Euro 2004 qualifying campaign was very unsuccessful as Belarus lost seven of their eight games. 

Belarus achieved some success in minor tournaments. In 2002, the team defeated Russia and Ukraine to win the LG Cup. In 2004 and 2008, they won the 12th and 14th editions of the Malta International Tournament respectively. 

During UEFA Euro 2020 qualifying, Belarus finished fourth in their group. With Belarus managing to top their group in the 2018–19 UEFA Nations League D, it qualified for the country's first ever play-offs, and the team was scheduled to play against Georgia. However, they lost 1–0, the team missed out on a place at Euro 2020.

Due to Belarusian involvement in the 2022 Russian invasion of Ukraine, UEFA, the European governing body for football, banned Belarusian national and club teams from hosting international matches and competitions.

Team image

Nickname
In August 2016, the Football Federation announced that the team's nickname would be the "White Wings". The name was influenced by the book The Land Beneath White Wings (1977) by Belarusian writer Uladzimir Karatkevich. The BFF's marketing and communications director said: "We are looking at various ways of establishing links with our literary heritage and cultural traditions", commenting that "If the Belarusian people opt to associate the team with Karatkevich, almost every phrase in the book can be used as a hashtag!"

Home venue

The team played the majority of its home matches at the Dinamo Stadium in Minsk. In late 2012 Dinamo Stadium was closed for renovation and the team started alternating between different home venues.

Since September 2021, Central Stadium in Kazan, Russia is the home venue because of travel sanctions imposed after an incident with Ryanair Flight 4978.

Kit
In 2011, home colors were changed to all red. All-White became the home colour a short time later and now appears with the pattern on the Belarus flag, with the away kit being in Black in 2016, also using an adidas template and placing the flag pattern on it.

Kit suppliers

Recent results and upcoming fixtures

2022

2023

2024

Coaching history

Players

Current squad
The following players were called up for friendly matches against Syria and Oman on 17 and 20 November 2022.

Caps and goals are correct as of 20 November, after the game against Oman.

Recent call-ups
The following players have also been called up to the Belarus squad during last 12 months.

INJ Withdrew due to injury
PRE Preliminary squad / standby
COV Withdrew due to positive COVID-19 test result

Records

Players in bold are still active with Belarus.

Most appearances

NB Sergei Aleinikov reached a combined 81 caps and 6 goals for Soviet Union, CIS and Belarus between 1984–1994.

Top goalscorers

Competitive record

FIFA World Cup

2022 FIFA World Cup qualification

UEFA European Championship

UEFA Euro 2024 qualification

UEFA Nations League

2022–23 UEFA Nations League

Relegation play-outs

|}

Head-to-head record

B-team
Belarus B national team has been assembled a number of times throughout the history to participate in occasional minor friendly matches and tournaments.  The team was most recently assembled for participation in 2017 King's Cup in Thailand on 14–16 July 2017.

See also

Belarus national under-23 football team
Belarus national under-21 football team
Belarus national under-19 football team
Belarus national under-17 football team
Belarus women's national football team

References

External links

Belarus Federation of Football (in Belarusian) (in Russian) (in English)
Belarus at FIFA 
Belarus at UEFA
Football.by (in Russian)
Fan Site of the Belarus National Team (in Belarusian)

 
European national association football teams
National sports teams established in 1992
1992 establishments in Belarus